SVC or .svc may refer to:

Biology 
 Spring viraemia of carp, a disease of fish
 Superior vena cava, a heart vein

Colleges 
 Saginaw Valley College, now Saginaw Valley State University, Michigan, US
 School of Visual Concepts, Seattle, Washington, US
 Southern Vermont College, near Bennington,  US

Finance
 Salvadoran colón, ISO 4217 currency code
 Stored-value card, a type of payment card

Organizations 
 Shanghai Volunteer Corps (1853−1942), of the Shanghai International Settlement
 Skills and Volunteering Cymru, a charity in Cardiff, Wales
 Society of Vacuum Coaters
 Sun Valley Center for the Arts and Humanities, Sun Valley, Idaho, US

Technology
 Saab Variable Compression engine
 Static VAR compensator, electrical power factor compensator

Computing 
 IBM SAN Volume Controller
 Scalable Video Coding, in video compression
 Supervisor Call instruction, a mainframe computer instruction
 Support-vector clustering, similar to support vector machine
 .svc, Microsoft IIS file extension
 Switched virtual circuit

Other uses 
 Smith–Volterra–Cantor set in mathematics
 SVC, the FAA identifier for Grant County Airport in Silver City, New Mexico, US